Alexander Vindman (Ukrainian: Олекса́ндр Семенович Ві́ндман; born June 6, 1975) is a retired United States Army lieutenant colonel who was the Director for European Affairs for the United States National Security Council (NSC) until he was reassigned on February 7, 2020. Vindman came to national attention in October 2019 when he testified before the United States Congress regarding the Trump–Ukraine scandal. His testimony provided evidence that resulted in a charge of abuse of power in the impeachment of Donald Trump.

Commissioned in 1999 as an infantry officer, Vindman received a Purple Heart medal for wounds he received from an IED attack in the Iraq War in 2004. Vindman became a foreign area officer specializing in Eurasia in 2008, and assumed the position of Director for European Affairs with the NSC in 2018.

In July 2020, Vindman retired after 21 years in the military. He cited vengeful behavior and bullying by President Trump and administration officials after he complied with a subpoena to testify in front of Congress during Trump's impeachment hearings. At the time of his retirement, Vindman's promotion to the rank of colonel had been abnormally stalled by the administration. In February 2022, he unsuccessfully sued several Trump allies, alleging that they had intimidated and retaliated against him while he testified in Congress.

Early life and education 
Alexander Semyon Vindman (né Aleksandr Semyonovich Vindman) and his identical twin brother Yevgeny were born in the Ukrainian Soviet Socialist Republic, Soviet Union to a Jewish family. After the death of their mother, the three-year-old twins and their older brother, Leonid, were brought to New York in December 1979 by their father, Semyon (Simon). They grew up in Brooklyn's Brighton Beach neighborhood. The twins appear briefly with their maternal grandmother in the Ken Burns documentary The Statue of Liberty. Vindman speaks fluent Russian and Ukrainian. He graduated in 1993 from Franklin Delano Roosevelt High School.

In 1999, Vindman graduated from the State University of New York at Binghamton with a bachelor of arts degree in history. He took part in the Reserve Officers' Training Corps while in college and received a second lieutenant's commission in the Army's Infantry Branch in January 1999. He later received a master of arts degree from Harvard University in Russian, Eastern European and Central Asian studies.

Career
Vindman completed the Infantry Officer Basic Course (IOBC) at Fort Benning in 1999 and was sent the next year to South Korea, where he led both infantry and anti-armor platoons. In addition to overseas assignments to South Korea and Germany, Vindman is a combat veteran of the Iraq War, and he served in Iraq from September 2004 to September 2005. In October 2004, he sustained an injury from a roadside bomb in Iraq, for which he received a Purple Heart. He was promoted to the rank of major in 2008, and to lieutenant colonel in September 2015.

During his Army career, Vindman earned the Ranger Tab, Combat Infantryman Badge, Expert Infantryman Badge, and Parachutist Badge, as well as four Army Commendation Medals and two Defense Meritorious Service Medals.

Beginning in 2008, Vindman became a Foreign Area Officer specializing in Eurasia. In this capacity he served in the U.S. embassies in Kyiv, Ukraine, and Moscow, Russia. Returning to Washington, D.C. he was then a politico-military affairs officer focused on Russia for the Chairman of the Joint Chiefs of Staff. Vindman was on the Joint Staff at the Pentagon from September 2015 to July 2018.

National Security Council

In July 2018, Vindman accepted an assignment with the National Security Council. In his role on the NSC, Vindman became part of the U.S. delegation at the inauguration of Ukraine's newly elected President, Volodymyr Zelensky. The five-member delegation, led by Rick Perry, United States Secretary of Energy, also included Kurt Volker, then U.S. Special Representative for Ukraine Negotiations; Gordon Sondland, United States Ambassador to the European Union; and Joseph Pennington, then acting chargé d'affaires.

Vindman was subpoenaed to testify before Congressional investigators on October 29, 2019, as part of the U.S. House of Representatives' impeachment inquiry against Donald Trump. He is the first White House official to testify who was actually on a July 25, 2019, telephone call between President Trump and Ukrainian President Volodymyr Zelensky, in which Trump asked Zelensky to investigate former Vice President Joe Biden's son Hunter Biden, while his father was campaigning for President. Based on his opening statement, obtained in advance by The New York Times, Vindman's testimony corroborates previous testimony from Fiona Hill, his former manager, and William B. Taylor Jr., acting Ambassador to Ukraine.

On October 28, 2019, Vindman's opening statement to a closed session of the House Intelligence Committee, House Foreign Affairs Committee, and House Oversight Committee was released, ahead of his testimony the following day. Vindman testified that: "In Spring of 2019, I became aware of outside influencers promoting a false and alternative narrative of Ukraine inconsistent with the consensus views of the interagency," which was "harmful to U.S. national security" and also "undermined U.S. Government efforts to expand cooperation with Ukraine".

Vindman states that, additionally, he was concerned by two events, both of which he objected to with senior officials in real time, and which he reported to the National Security Council's lead attorney. The first event occurred at a July 10 meeting between Ukraine's then Secretary of National Security and Defense Council Oleksandr Danylyuk, and then US National Security Advisor John Bolton, at which Ambassadors Volker and Sondland, and Energy Secretary Rick Perry were in attendance, and at which Sondland asked Ukraine to launch investigations into the Bidens in order to get a meeting with President Trump. Vindman states that Bolton cut the meeting short, and that both Vindman and Hill told Ambassador Sondland that his comments were inappropriate and reported their concerns to the NSC's lead counsel.

The second event occurred on a July 25 phone call between Presidents Trump and Zelensky. Vindman states, "I was concerned by the call. I did not think it was proper to demand that a foreign government investigate a U.S. citizen, and I was worried about the implications for the U.S. Government's support of Ukraine. I realized that if Ukraine pursued an investigation into the Bidens and Burisma, it would likely be interpreted as a partisan play which would undoubtedly result in Ukraine losing the bipartisan support it has thus far maintained. This would all undermine U.S. national security." Vindman also stated that he reported his concern to the NSC's lead counsel, John Eisenberg.

Vindman later testified in person before the US House of Representatives on November 19, 2019. In his testimony, Vindman stated that he made a report to an intelligence official about what he heard during Trump's call with the Ukrainian President and felt what the President mentioned during the phone conversation was "improper".
 
Because of his testimony, Vindman was denounced by Trump and repeatedly attacked by Republican lawmakers and television commentators. As a result, he reached out to the Army regarding his and his family's safety.

In his opening statement, Vindman assured his father that he had made the right decision in emigrating from the Soviet Union to the United States. Vindman stated, "In Russia, my act of ... offering public testimony involving the President would surely cost me my life. I am grateful for my father's brave act of hope 40 years ago and for the privilege of being an American citizen and public servant, where I can live free of fear for mine  and my family's safety. Dad, my sitting here today, in the U.S. Capitol talking to our elected officials is proof that you made the right decision forty years ago to leave the Soviet Union and come here to United States of America in search of a better life for our family. Do not worry, I will be fine for telling the truth."

On February 7, 2020, Vindman told NSC colleagues he expected to leave the White House's National Security Council to return to the Department of Defense. Trump had earlier implied he might remove Vindman from his post. Later that day Vindman was escorted out of the White House, according to his attorney. His twin brother, Lieutenant Colonel Yevgeny Vindman, was also escorted off the White House grounds at the same time. Both were slated for reassignment within the Army. Subsequent news reports indicated that Vindman had been chosen to attend the in-residence course at the United States Army War College during its 2020-2021 session.

On February 10, 2020, Senate Minority Leader Chuck Schumer (D-NY) sent a letter in an apparent response to the firing of the two brothers that requested federal Inspectors General investigate possible retaliation against "anyone who has made, or in the future makes, protected disclosures of presidential misconduct". On February 13, Trump's former chief of staff, retired Marine General John Kelly, defended Vindman's actions and testimony. "He did exactly what we teach them to do from cradle to grave. He went and told his boss what he just heard," Kelly said.

During a panel discussion held on February 11, 2020, at the Atlantic Council, the president's National Security Advisor, Robert C. O'Brien said that it was his decision to transfer both Vindman brothers back to the Army for re-assignment and denied that the move was ordered by Trump in retaliation for Vindman's testimony. "I can absolutely tell you that they were not retaliated against", O'Brien told the panel. O'Brien also disputed the move as being characterized as "fired" since both brothers remain on active duty. O'Brien noted that their transfer was part of a larger NSA staff reduction. His remarks contradicted Trump, who tweeted that he had ousted Vindman for insubordination and for doing "a lot of bad things".

Retirement and post-military career
On July 2, 2020, Senator Tammy Duckworth announced her intention to block Senate confirmation of over one thousand military promotions unless defense secretary Mark Esper provided written confirmation that the Trump administration would not block Vindman's promotion to colonel. Less than a week later, Vindman announced through his lawyer that he would be retiring from the U.S. military. Vindman's lawyer, David Pressman, described "a campaign of bullying, intimidation, and retaliation" by the Trump administration as the reason for his client's retirement.

In November 2020, Vindman joined the staff of the national security blog Lawfare with a fellowship of the Pritzker Military Foundation. Additionally, he is pursuing a Ph.D. in international affairs at Johns Hopkins University's Paul H. Nitze School of Advanced International Studies, with an expected completion date in 2022. On August 1, 2020, Vindman authored an opinion piece in the Washington Post addressing his retirement. On February 2, 2022, Vindman sued several Trump allies, alleging that they intimidated and retaliated against him while he testified in Congress, and thereby violated the Ku Klux Klan Act of 1871. The defendants in the lawsuit were Donald Trump Jr., Rudy Giuliani, former White House deputy chief of staff Dan Scavino, and former White House deputy communications director Julia Hahn. However, on the 8th of November 2022, judges dismissed the case

Personal life 
Vindman is married to Rachel Vindman, née Cartmill. In 2020, Vindman and his wife Rachel appeared in an advertisement created by The Lincoln Project and VoteVets supporting Joe Biden's presidential campaign. The couple has one daughter, born in 2011.

His identical twin brother, Yevgeny S. "Eugene" Vindman, is an Army colonel and JAG Officer who was assigned as an attorney on the National Security Council staff handling ethics issues, until he was dismissed from that post on February 7, 2020, the same time as Alexander was removed from his NSC post; Yevgeny was promoted by the Biden administration to colonel on March 16, 2021. The Defense Department inspector general found in May 2022 that the Trump administration unlawfully retaliated against Yevgeny for his role in revealing the Trump-Ukraine scandal.

Vindman has an older brother, Leonid Vindman, who also served as an Army officer.

Vindman appeared in "The Mormon Advantage", the finale of the 11th season of Curb Your Enthusiasm, in December 2021.

Military awards 
At his retirement, Vindman received the Legion of Merit. Vindman's additional awards and decorations include the Purple Heart; Defense Meritorious Service Medal with bronze oak leaf cluster (2nd award); Meritorious Service Medal; Army Commendation Medal with three oak leaf clusters (4th award); Army Achievement Medal with two oak leaf clusters (3rd award); National Defense Service Medal; Global War on Terrorism Expeditionary Medal; Global War on Terrorism Service Medal; Korea Defense Service Medal; Army Service Ribbon; Overseas Service Ribbon (4th award); Valorous Unit Award; Joint Meritorious Unit Award; Navy Unit Commendation; National Intelligence Meritorious Unit Citation; and Republic of Korea Presidential Unit Citation. He is a recipient of the Combat Infantryman Badge; Expert Infantryman Badge; Ranger Tab; Basic Parachutist Badge; the Presidential Service Badge; and Joint Chiefs of Staff Identification Badge.

Filmography

Television

See also 
 First impeachment inquiry against Donald Trump

References

Works

External links

1975 births
United States Army personnel of the Iraq War
American people of Ukrainian-Jewish descent
Binghamton University alumni
Harvard Graduate School of Arts and Sciences alumni
Living people
People from Brighton Beach
People from Brooklyn
Trump administration personnel
Trump–Ukraine scandal
American twins
Soviet emigrants to the United States
United States Army officers
United States Department of Defense officials
United States National Security Council staffers
Recipients of the Meritorious Service Medal (United States)
Legionnaires of the Legion of Merit